VfL Bochum II (also known as VfL Bochum Amateure or VfL Bochum U-23) was the reserve team of German football club VfL Bochum.

The team has made two appearances in the first round of the DFB-Pokal, in 1984–85 and 2005–06. Since 2008 the team has been playing in the tier four Regionalliga West. The team was intended to be the final step between Bochum's youth setup and the first team, and was usually made up of promising youngsters between the age of 18 and 23, with a few veteran players drafted in to provide experience.

History
The team first made an appearance in the highest football league in Westphalia, the Verbandsliga Westfalen, in 1975 but failed to qualify for the new Oberliga Westfalen in 1978 and had to remain in the Verbandsliga Westfalen until 1982 when a league championship took it up to Oberliga level.

Between 1982 and 1999 the team predominantly played in the Oberliga, only interrupted by stints back in the Verbandsliga in 1988–89 and from 1993 to 1997. After its return to the Oberliga in 1997 the team was a much stronger side, winning the league in 1999 and moving up to the Regionalliga West/Südwest for a season. It played in the Oberliga again from 2001 to 2008, finishing runners-up on three occasions but not quite able to move back up to the Regionalliga again.

In 2008 a third place allowed the team qualification to the new Regionalliga West where it has played since, finishing fourteenth in five out of six seasons between 2008 and 2014.

The team also made two appearances in the German Cup, reaching the second round in 1984–85 when it lost to VfB Stuttgart and the first round in 2005–06, when it lost to Erzgebirge Aue.

In March 2015 the club announced that it would withdraw its reserve side from competition at the end of the 2014–15 season to concentrate on its youth teams instead.

Honours
The team's honours:
Landesliga Westfalen
 Champions: 1975
Verbandsliga Westfalen
 Champions: 1982
 Runners-up: 1989, 1997
Oberliga Westfalen
 Champions: 1999
 Runners-up: 2001, 2003, 2005
Westphalia Cup
 Runners-up: 2005

Seasons since 1973–74 
The season-by-season performance of the team:

Notes

Key

Players

Coaches

Head coaches since 1994–95

References

External links
Official site
Profile at fussballdaten.de
Profile at weltfussball.de

VfL Bochum
North Rhine-Westphalia reserve football teams
German reserve football teams
association football clubs established in 1973
association football clubs disestablished in 2015